Hinde's rock rat (Aethomys hindei) is a species of rodent in the family Muridae
found in Burundi, Cameroon, the Central African Republic, the Democratic Republic of the Congo, Ethiopia, Kenya, Rwanda, Sudan, Tanzania, and Uganda.
Its natural habitats are subtropical or tropical moist lowland forest, moist savanna, and subtropical or tropical seasonally wet or flooded lowland grassland. Oldfield Thomas named it in honor of Sidney Langford Hinde, a British officer and recreational naturalist.

References

Aethomys
Rodents of Africa
Mammals described in 1902
Taxa named by Oldfield Thomas
Taxonomy articles created by Polbot